A Bullet in the Head is a 1990 Canadian drama film directed by Attila Bertalan. The film was selected as the Canadian entry for the Best Foreign Language Film at the 64th Academy Awards, but was not accepted as a nominee.

The film centres on a soldier, wounded in war, who is struggling to survive after being trapped behind enemy lines.

The film's dialogue is spoken entirely in an invented language. It was the first film ever selected as Canada's submission to the Academy Award competition for Best Foreign Language Film which was not in French, and one of just four such films overall alongside the later Atanarjuat: The Fast Runner, Water and Eternal Spring.

Film historian Peter Cowie called it "a nightmarish fairytale about the absurdity and futility of war."

Cast
 Kathy Horner as Witch
 Andrew Campbell as Young Enemy Soldier
 Jan Stychalsky as Old Enemy Soldier
 Victoria Sands as Gypsy Woman
 Claude Forget as Wagon Driver
 Rebecca Posner as Katya
 Susan Eyton-Jones as Venna

See also
 List of submissions to the 64th Academy Awards for Best Foreign Language Film
 List of Canadian submissions for the Academy Award for Best Foreign Language Film

References

External links
 

1990 films
1990 drama films
1990s war drama films
Canadian war drama films
Fictional-language films
1990s Canadian films